Okechukwu Patrick Egu  (born February 20, 1967) is a former Nigerian American football running back. He played several seasons for the National Football League's Tampa Bay Buccaneers, New England Patriots, and New York Jets.

Born in Nigeria, Egu attended John F. Kennedy High School in Richmond, California. He came to Nevada–Reno via Contra Costa College, and was selected 230th overall by the Tampa Bay Buccaneers in the 1989 NFL Draft.

References 

1967 births
Living people
African-American players of American football
American sportspeople of Nigerian descent
American football running backs
Tampa Bay Buccaneers players
New England Patriots players
New York Jets players
Nevada Wolf Pack football players
Nigerian players of American football
21st-century African-American people
20th-century African-American sportspeople
People from Owerri
Sportspeople from Imo State